Il trono e la seggiola is a 1918 Italian film directed by Augusto Genina.

Cast
Oreste Bilancia   
Piera Bouvier   
Tullio Carminati   
Alfonso Cassini   
Yvonne Fleuriel

External links 
 

1918 films
Italian silent feature films
Films directed by Augusto Genina
Italian black-and-white films